Mazio Denmar Vesey Royster (born August 3, 1970) is a former American professional football player who was selected by the Tampa Bay Buccaneers in the eleventh round of the 1992 NFL Draft. A ,  Running Back from the University of Southern California, Royster played in four NFL seasons from 1992 to 1996 for the Buccaneers and the Jacksonville Jaguars.

Royster is currently a sports coordinator for movies, television shows, and commercials.

References

Living people
1970 births
Players of American football from Berkeley, California
Tampa Bay Buccaneers players
Jacksonville Jaguars players
American football running backs
USC Trojans football players
Scottish Claymores players